Xyridacma alectoraria is a moth of the  family Geometridae. It was described by Francis Walker in 1860 using a specimen collected in Auckland. It is endemic to New Zealand. This species is regarded as being rarely observed.

References

External links

 Citizen science observations

Moths of New Zealand
Endemic fauna of New Zealand
Moths described in 1860
Taxa named by Francis Walker (entomologist)
Oenochrominae
Endemic moths of New Zealand